"Around the World" is a song by the Danish-Norwegian dance-pop group Aqua from their second studio album, Aquarius. It was released as the album's second single in April 2000 and was their final release in the United Kingdom before their split in mid-2001. The song became their second and final top-ten single from the album in Denmark, and it reached the top 20 in Italy, Norway, Spain, and Sweden.

Background and release
"Around the World" was originally called "Larger than Life", but was renamed after American boy band Backstreet Boys released a single with the same title in 1999. The group has described the song as a "happy-dancing song with a huge, massive choir."

"Around the World" was released on 25 April 2000, with the United Kingdom release following on 29 May 2000. The UK release became their lowest-charting single at the time, peaking at number 26. "Around the World" managed to reach number four in the group's native Denmark. In Norway, it made the top 20 at number 16, and in Sweden, it peaked at number four and was certified Gold.

Track listings

UK CD1 and European CD single
 "Around the World" (radio edit) – 3:28
 "Around the World" (Sound Surfers club mix) – 6:05
 "Around the World" (Dave Sears club mix) – 7:05
 "Around the World" (video) – 3:28

UK CD2
 "Around the World" (radio edit) – 3:28
 "Around the World" (Junior's Marathon radio mix) – 4:42
 "Around the World" (Rüegsegger#Wittwer remix) – 7:41

Australian CD single
 "Around the World" (radio edit) – 3:28
 "Around the World" (Sound Surfers club mix) – 6:05
 "Around the World" (Dave Sears club mix) – 7:04
 "Around the World" (Junior's Marathon mix) – 13:40
 "Around the World" (Rüegsegger#Wittwer remix) – 7:41

Dutch CD single
 "Around the World" (radio edit) – 3:28
 "Around the World" (Sound Surfers radio edit) – 3:39

Australian digital download (10 September 2017)
 "Around the World" – 3:29
 "Around the World" (Sound Surfers radio edit) – 3:39
 "Around the World" (Jonathan peters radio remix) – 3:47
 "Around the World" (Sound Surfers club mix) – 6:07
 "Around the World" (Jonathan Peters club mix) – 7:27
 "Around the World" (Rüegsegger#Wittwer remix) – 7:41
 "Around the World" (Dave Sears club mix) – 7:07
 "Around the World" (Junior's Marathon mix) – 13:42

Charts

Weekly charts

Year-end charts

Certifications

References

2000 singles
2000 songs
Aqua (band) songs
Songs written by Claus Norreen
Songs written by Søren Rasted
Universal Records singles